Calumet Township is one of 29 townships in Cook County, Illinois, United States.  As of the 2010 census, its population was 20,777.

Geography

Cities, towns, villages
 Blue Island (eastern half)
 Calumet Park
 Chicago (small part of Riverdale neighborhood)
 Riverdale (northern half)

Adjacent townships
 Thornton Township (southeast)
 Bremen Township (southwest)
 Worth Township (west)

Cemeteries
The township contains Cedar Park Cemetery.

Major highways
  Interstate 57
  Illinois Route 1

Rivers
 Little Calumet River

Landmarks
 Calumet Woods (Cook County Forest Preserves)
 Whistler Preserve (Cook County Forest Preserves)

Demographics

Political districts
 Illinois's 1st congressional district
 State House District 27
 State House District 28
 State House District 30
 State Senate District 14
 State Senate District 15

References
Bibliography
 
 United States Census Bureau 2007 TIGER/Line Shapefiles
 United States National Atlas
Notes

External links
 City-Data.com

Townships in Cook County, Illinois
Townships in Illinois